Herbert Newby McCoy (June 29, 1870, Richmond, Indiana – May 7, 1945, Los Angeles, California) was an American chemist who taught at the University of Chicago and the University of Utah and was the vice-president of Lindsay Light & Chemical Company.
He contributed numerous papers on physical chemistry, radioactivity and rare earths.

McCoy and his wife-to-be, chemist Ethel Mary Terry, wrote the three-volume set Introduction to General Chemistry (1919), Laboratory outline of General Chemistry (1920) and Teachers  Manual and Notes (1920).

Background 
McCoy was born in Richmond, Indiana, on June 29, 1870. His father died when he was young, leaving him to earn his own education.
He earned his BS (1892) and MS (1893) from Purdue University where he worked with Winthrop E. Stone.
He worked as a chemist for Swift  and  Company in Chicago and as a teacher at Fargo  College in North Dakota before returning to university. 
He earned his Ph.D. from the University of Chicago (1898), working with Julius Stieglitz. His Ph.D. dissertation was “On the Hydrochlorides of Carbo-phenylimido Derivatives” (1898).

Career
McCoy was an Assistant professor at the University of Utah (1899–1901), and taught at University of Chicago (1901–1917).
He and his wife-to-be, Ethel Terry,  wrote a three-volume introductory set of texts, an Introduction to General Chemistry, consisting of an introductory text, a laboratory manual, and a teacher's guide.

McCoy published numerous papers on physical chemistry, radioactivity and rare earths. He was the first person to demonstrate that the alpha-ray activity of a compound is proportional to its uranium content, quantitatively indicating that radioactivity is an atomic property. On this relationship is based a standard of measurement, the McCoy number. McCoy also proved that uranium is a parent of radium.

McCoy did considerable work with uranium and thorium, which at the time were believed to be  rare earths. McCoy's research contributed to the understanding of relationships among elements in the period table.  In 1904, he independently demonstrated spontaneous transmutation of radium from uranium. As well, McCoy and William H. Ross clearly identified what came to be known as isotopes as chemically inseparable substances, a realization that enabled researchers to simplify models of the periodic table.
Studying what would become known as the thorium group, McCoy and Ross verified Otto Hahns prediction of "mesothorium", an isotope of radium.

As early as 1911, McCoy introduced the term "synthetic metals". McCoy and  William  C.  Moore attempted to use electrolysis to produce a metallic species from tetramethylammonium salts.  Extending the work of  Thomas Johann Seebeck (1770-1831) to organic quaternary amines, instead of simple ammonium salts, they reported what was believed to be the first organic metal. Electrolysis produced of a crystalline solid with a metallic luster which displayed electrical conductivity similar to that of metals. It was believed to be a mercury amalgam with the general formula HgN(CH3)4 until 1986, when Allen J. Bard  proposed a more compelling explanation for the results.

McCoy was President of the Carnotite Reduction Company in Colorado (1917-1920).
The Carnotite Reduction Company processed ore containing carnotite and manufactured radium.
McCoy became a vice-president of Lindsay Light & Chemical Company in  Chicago in 1919. Lindsay Light manufactured mantles for gas lights using radioactive thorium.

McCoy moved to Los Angeles in 1927. There he continued to study rare earths as a guest researcher in the laboratory of B. A. Stagner, and building his own private laboratory at home over his garage.

McCoy died on May 7, 1945 in Los Angeles, California.

Recognition
McCoy received the Willard Gibbs Award in 1937. At that time, he was described by Marie Curie as the "foremost American authority on radioactivity".

The Herbert Newby McCoy Award at Purdue University was established in 1964 by Mrs. Ethel M. Terry McCoy in honor of her husband.

References

External links 
 
 

1870 births
1945 deaths
People from Richmond, Indiana
American chemists
Purdue University alumni
University of Chicago alumni
University of Utah faculty
Rare earth scientists